American Hardcore refers to:

 American Hardcore (album), by L.A. Guns
 American Hardcore (film), 2006 film
 American Hardcore: A Tribal History, book written by Steven Blush